Nicolas-Médard Audinot (also Odinot, Oudinot (7 June 1732, Paris – 21 May 1801) was a French actor, singer, impresario, and puppeteer.

He first played at the Comédie Italienne. In 1762, he set up a puppeteer theatre at foire Saint-Germain where each character was an imitation of an actor of the Comédie-Italienne. His wood comedians attracted the crowd, and soon Audinot founded the Théâtre de l'Ambigu-Comique where he substituted children to puppets.

In 1772, he presented grand pantomimes which made his fortune.

He authored Le Tonnelier, an opéra comique presented with success (music by Gossec, Philidor and Trial).

Bibliography 
 Michel Faul, Les Tribulations de Nicolas-Médard Audinot, fondateur du théâtre de l'Ambigu-Comique, Symétrie, Lyon, 2013 .
 Laurent Turcot, « De la définition du lieu théâtral populaire : police et spectateurs du boulevard à Paris au XVIIIe siècle », Revue d’histoire du théâtre. no 3, 231, 2006, .
 Laurent Turcot, « Directeur, comédiens et police : relations de travail dans les spectacles populaires à Paris au XVIIIe siècle », Histoire, Économie et Société, janvier-Mars 2004 (1), 23e année, .

References

External links 
 Nicolas-Médard Audinot on data.bnf.fr

1732 births
1801 deaths
French puppeteers
French theatre managers and producers
18th-century French dramatists and playwrights
18th-century French male actors
French male stage actors
Burials at Père Lachaise Cemetery